The Motor Boat Boys, by Louis Arundel, is a series of adventure books for boys, published by M. A. Donohue & Co., Chicago, Illinois, from 1912 through 1915. The series featured six teen-aged boys of the Motor Boat Club, and their adventures on various waterways.

Boats and crews

Tramp
Pilot: Jack Stormaways (also Commodore of the Motor Boat Club)
Mate: Jimmy Brannagan

Wireless
Pilot: George Rollins
Mate: Nick Longfellow

Comfort
Pilot: Herb Dickson
Mate: Josh Purdue

Series titles

Motor Boat Boys' Mississippi Cruise; or The Dash for Dixie, 1912.
Motor Boat Boys on the Great Lakes; or Exploring the Mystic Isle of Mackinac, 1912.
Motor Boat Boys on the St. Lawrence River; or Adventures Among the Thousand Islands , 1912.
Motor Boat Boys Among the Florida Keys; or The Struggle for the Leadership, 1913.
Motor Boat Boys Down the Coast; or Through Storm and Stress to Florida, 1913.
Motor Boat Boys' River Chase; or Six Chums Afloat and Ashore, 1914.
Motor Boat Boys Down the Danube; or Caught in the Whirlpool of War, 1915.

External links
Motor Boat Boys' Mississippi Cruise; or The Dash for Dixie at Manybooks.net
 

Book series introduced in 1912
Juvenile series
Novel series